In geometry, the Möbius–Kantor configuration is a configuration consisting of eight points and eight lines, with three points on each line and three lines through each point. It is not possible to draw points and lines having this pattern of incidences in the Euclidean plane, but it is possible in the complex projective plane.

Coordinates
 asked whether there exists a pair of polygons with p sides each, having the property that the vertices of one polygon lie on the lines through the edges of the other polygon, and vice versa. If so, the vertices and edges of these polygons would form a projective configuration. For  there is no solution in the Euclidean plane, but  found pairs of polygons of this type, for a generalization of the problem in which the points and edges belong to the complex projective plane. That is, in Kantor's solution, the coordinates of the polygon vertices are complex numbers.

 supplies the following simple complex projective coordinates for the eight points of the Möbius–Kantor configuration:
(1,0,0), (0,0,1), (ω, −1, 1), (−1, 0, 1),
(−1,ω2,1), (1,ω,0), (0,1,0), (0,−1,1),
where ω denotes a complex cube root of 1.

The eight points and eight lines of the Möbius–Kantor configuration, with these coordinates, form the eight vertices and eight 3-edges of the complex polygon 3{3}3. Coxeter named it a Möbius–Kantor polygon.

Abstract incidence pattern

More abstractly, the Möbius–Kantor configuration can be described as a system of eight points and eight triples of points such that each point belongs to exactly three of the triples. With the additional conditions (natural to points and lines) that no pair of points belong to more than one triple and that no two triples have more than one point in their intersection, any two systems of this type are equivalent under some permutation of the points. That is, the Möbius–Kantor configuration is the unique projective configuration of type (8383).

The Möbius–Kantor graph derives its name from being the Levi graph of the Möbius–Kantor configuration. It has one vertex per point and one vertex per triple, with an edge connecting two vertices if they correspond to a point and to a triple that contains that point.

The points and lines of the Möbius–Kantor configuration can be described as a matroid, whose elements are the points of the configuration and whose nontrivial flats are the lines of the configuration. In this matroid, a set S of points is independent if and only if either  or S consists of three non-collinear points. As a matroid, it has been called the MacLane matroid, after the work of  proving that it cannot be oriented; it is one of several known minor-minimal non-orientable matroids.

Related configurations
The solution to Möbius' problem of mutually inscribed polygons for values of p greater than four is also of interest. The Möbius configuration is a three-dimensional analogue of the Möbius–Kantor configuration consisting of two mutually inscribed tetrahedra.

The Möbius–Kantor configuration can be augmented by adding four lines through the four pairs of points not already connected by lines, and by adding a ninth point on the four new lines. The resulting configuration, the Hesse configuration, shares with the Möbius–Kantor configuration the property of being realizable with complex coordinates but not with real coordinates. Deleting any one point from the Hesse configuration produces a copy of the Möbius–Kantor configuration.
Both configurations may also be described algebraically in terms of the abelian group  with nine elements.
These nine elements and twelve cosets form the Hesse configuration. Removing the zero element and the four cosets containing zero gives rise to the Möbius–Kantor configuration.

Notes

References
.
. Reprinted in The Visual Mind, MIT Press, 1993, pp. 19–26, .
.
. 
.
. In Gesammelte Werke (1886), vol. 1, pp. 439–446.
.

External links

Configurations (geometry)